Steven "Big Mac" MacIntyre (born August 8, 1980) is a Canadian former professional ice hockey left winger, who last played for the Carolina Thunderbirds in the FPHL, and is known as an enforcer.

Playing career

Amateur
MacIntyre came to the Continental Elite Hockey League (CEHL) in 2001, after earning the reputation as one of Canada's best fighters in Major Junior circles. He was recruited to play for the Tri-City Hurricanes in Bay City, Michigan, who later became the Bay County Blizzard after a mid-season sale of the team by original owner Mike Killbreath. MacIntyre led the CEHL in penalty minutes and received a lifetime ban late in the season for his part in a nasty brawl with the Detroit Lightning. Banned by the CEHL, MacIntyre signed with the Muskegon Fury of the United Hockey League (UHL) and he helped them win the UHL's Colonial Cup, as playoff champions.

Professional 
On May 22, 2003, he was signed by the New York Rangers, after playing two seasons as the most feared fighter in the UHL. He would spend the next two years within the Rangers' minor league affiliates, the Hartford Wolf Pack and the Charlotte Checkers, before having brief stints playing for the Quad City Mallards and the Providence Bruins, in 2006–07 and 2007–08, respectively.

On July 3, 2008, he signed as a free agent with the Florida Panthers, having never played an NHL game in a Rangers uniform. This would turn out to be MacIntyre's first stint in Florida (before returning in 2009). He was assigned to their minor league affiliates, the Rochester Americans on waivers, on September 28, 2008. He was picked up on waivers by the Edmonton Oilers two days later, on September 30. MacIntyre had an immediate impact in Edmonton, playing his first NHL game on October 3, against the Oilers' arch-rivals, the Calgary Flames - earning himself 7 minutes in the penalty box; 2 minutes for roughing and a further 5 minutes for a fight with Jim Vandermeer.

On November 11, 2008, the Oilers placed MacIntyre on their Injured Reserve (IR) list, with a fractured orbital bone, an injury he sustained from a fight five nights earlier, against the Pittsburgh Penguins with fellow NHL "heavyweight" Eric Godard. He subsequently would miss the next 26 games. He would make his return on January 11, 2009, in a 2–1 win over the St. Louis Blues. Two nights later, January 13, MacIntyre would score his first NHL goal, in a 5–2 victory over the Washington Capitals. MacIntyre would add another goal later in the 2008–09 season and would finish with a total of 2 points from 22 games, collecting 40 penalty minutes.

On November 9, 2009, he was assigned to the Oilers' minor league affiliate, the Springfield Falcons on waivers, after playing bit parts in 4 games. However, he would be picked up a day later, on November 10, by his former team, the Florida Panthers. He would spend the rest of the 2009–10 season between the Panthers and their AHL affiliates, the Rochester Americans, helping the Americans reach the 2010 Calder Cup Playoffs.

On July 2, 2010, Steve MacIntyre signed a 1-year contract with the Edmonton Oilers, returning to the team he started his NHL career with. In an interview on The Team 1260 MacIntyre said "he was excited to be back" and was "very thankful" at the chance for another opportunity to play for the Oilers.

On July 1, 2011, MacIntyre became a free agent. He later signed a one-year, two-way contract with the Pittsburgh Penguins on July 12.

On January 11, 2012, the Pittsburgh Penguins placed Steve MacIntyre on waivers, and he was sent down to the Wilkes-Barre/Scranton Penguins after he cleared waivers the following day.

On September 23, 2013, prior to the 2013–14 season, the Edmonton Oilers claimed MacIntyre off waivers, marking it the third tenure within the organization.  He was assigned to their AHL affiliate, the Oklahoma City Barons.  He did not re-sign with the Barons at the end of the season and on September 11, 2014, the Norfolk Admirals announced they had signed MacIntyre.

On January 19, 2018, the Carolina Thunderbirds of the Federal Hockey League announced they had signed MacIntyre.

Career statistics

References

External links

1980 births
Living people
Canadian ice hockey left wingers
Charlotte Checkers (1993–2010) players
Edmonton Oilers players
Florida Panthers players
Hartford Wolf Pack players
Ice hockey people from Saskatchewan
Jacksonville Barracudas (WHA2) players
Medicine Hat Tigers players
Muskegon Fury players
Norfolk Admirals players
OCN Blizzard players
Oklahoma City Barons players
Pittsburgh Penguins players
Prince Albert Raiders players
Providence Bruins players
Quad City Mallards (UHL) players
Red Deer Rebels players
Rochester Americans players
Saskatoon Blades players
Undrafted National Hockey League players
Wilkes-Barre/Scranton Penguins players